
Gmina Gostyń is an urban-rural gmina (administrative district) in Gostyń County, Greater Poland Voivodeship, in west-central Poland.

Villages
Apart from the town of Gostyń, Gmina Gostyń contains the villages and settlements of Aleksandrowo, Bogusławki, Bronisławki, Brzezie, Brzezie-Huby, Czachorowo, Czajkowo, Dalabuszki, Daleszyn, Dusina, Gaj, Gola, Klony, Kosowo, Krajewice, Kunowo, Malewo, Markowo, Miranowo, Osowo, Ostrowo, Otówko, Pijanowskie Huby, Płaczkowo, Poraj, Siemowo, Sikorzyn, Skowronki, Stankowo, Stary Gostyń, Stężyca, Szczodrochowo, Tworzymirki, Witoldowo and Ziółkowo.

Neighbouring gminas
Gmina Gostyń is bordered by the gminas of Dolsk, Krobia, Krzemieniewo, Krzywiń, Piaski and Poniec.

References
Polish official population figures 2006

Gostyn
Gostyń County